Dublin, Wicklow and Wexford Railway (DW&WR) 55 to 58 were 4-4-0 locomotives built from 1895 at Vulcan Foundry for express passenger duties on the Dublin—Wexford mainline.  They were to remain the DW&WR's and subsequent Dublin and South Eastern Railway's leading express passenger locomotive until the arrival of Nos. 67 and 68 some ten years later.

History
These 4-4-0 locomotives built from 1895 at Vulcan Foundry and named Rathdown, Rathmines, Rathnew and Rathdrum.  In their initial form they were poor steamers, the suggestion being the locomotive superintendent Grierson had specified larger cylinders on a previous design for an English railway without balancing this with an increased boiler.  His successor Cronin rebuilt the locomotives with Belpaire boilers resulting in improved performance.  On amalgamation to Great Southern Railways in 1925 they became numbered 450 to 453 and allocated to class 450/D8.  They were withdrawn between 1939 and 1940.

Operations
These engines took over the express passenger trains from the smaller 2-4-0 type on the DW&WR's Dublin—Wexford mainline route.

Notes and references

Notes

References

4-4-0 locomotives
5 ft 3 in gauge locomotives
Railway locomotives introduced in 1896
Scrapped locomotives
Steam locomotives of Ireland
Vulcan Foundry locomotives